Schiffermuelleria imogena is a moth in the family Oecophoridae first described by Arthur Gardiner Butler in 1879. It is found in Japan.

References

Oecophorinae